Anthony Alba (born 31 July 1984), popularly known as Jaby Koay, is an American YouTuber, reviewer, and social media personality. He reviews movies, TV shows, trailers, and makes reaction videos, vlogs, as well as skit videos early in his YouTube career. His channel CineDesi is dedicated to India specific content, where his another channel Cinepals is dedicated to most of western content.   

His podcasts, streams and QnA's are also very popular. Jaby has conducted interviews with many celebrities and internet personalities like Jordindian, R Madhavan and Alia Bhatt  as well as he worked on several of his own short film projects, including Stalker (2017), Rost in Translation (2014), and Devil's Night (2016). He played the role of Aaron Darden in the comedy series Appland. He has a huge fan following in India. When he started making videos on various Indian topics, he became more popular in India. In 2017 and 2018, he traveled to India and uploaded a series of vlogs, where he shared some moments from his trip. Apart from him, another familiar face in his videos is Achara Kirk, one of Jaby's companions.

References 

1984 births
Living people
American YouTubers
People from Los Angeles